The 2018 William Hill North American Championship was the second edition of the tournament organized by the Professional Darts Corporation for North American players. The tournament took place at the Mandalay Bay, Las Vegas, United States on 5 July 2018, and featured the 8 players from the North American side of players that had qualified for the 2018 US Darts Masters, competing in a knockout system, with the winner earning a place in the 2019 PDC World Darts Championship.

 was the defending champion after defeating  6–5 in the 2017 final, but he didn't even appear at the qualifiers for the tournament.  won the title after defeating  6–4 in the final.

Format
The format of the tournament was the same as before, using a leg format, with all the matches being the best of 11 legs (or first to 6 legs).

Prize money
The total prize fund was US$25,000. The winner of the tournament got a spot in the 2019 PDC World Darts Championship.

Qualifiers
The eight qualifiers for the tournament were the 8 players from the North American side of players on the 2018 US Darts Masters.

The qualifiers were:

Draw

References

North American Championship
North American Championship
North American Championship